Aymar the Monk, also known as Aimery or Aimaro Monaco dei Corbizzi (? in Florence – October 1202 in Palestine), was Archbishop of Caesarea and Latin Patriarch of Jerusalem.

Biography  
The noble Corbizzi family was originally from Fiesole in Tuscany. From 1171 to 1177 he was magister and chancellor of the patriarch of Jerusalem Amalric of Nesle.  At the time this prelate of Florentine origin was simply called "Monachus", the name "Aymar" and belonging to the Corbizzi family are instead considered historically unfounded later additions.

He was archbishop of Caesarea in Palestine from 1181 until 1194, when the clergy of the Holy Sepulchre, who desired a patriarch residing in the east, elected him the Latin Patriarch of Jerusalem, the latter seat vacant from 1191. The Monk held this position until his death. He may have held the position of archbishop of Caesarea together with that of the Patriarch for three years, until 1197.  He was present at the siege of Acre and described it in a poem entitled De expugnata Accone liber tetrastichus seu rithmus de expeditione ierosolimitana.

Notes

Bibliography

12th-century births
1200s deaths
Latin Patriarchs of Jerusalem
12th-century Roman Catholic archbishops in the Kingdom of Jerusalem
13th-century Roman Catholic archbishops
12th-century people of the Kingdom of Jerusalem
13th-century people of the Kingdom of Jerusalem
12th-century Italian Roman Catholic priests
Latin archbishops of Caesarea